The Pebble Bed Modular Reactor (PBMR) is a particular design of pebble bed reactor developed by South African company PBMR (Pty) Ltd from 1994 until 2009. PBMR facilities include gas turbine and heat transfer labs at the Potchefstroom Campus of North-West University, and at Pelindaba, a high pressure and temperature helium test rig, as well as a prototype fuel fabrication plant. A planned test reactor at Koeberg was not built.

Reactor Design 
The PBMR is characterised by inherent safety features, which mean that no human error or equipment failure can cause an accident that would harm the public.

Heat from the PBMR can be used for a variety of industrial process applications, including process steam for cogeneration applications, in-situ oil sands recovery, ethanol applications, refinery and petrochemical applications. The high temperature heat can also be used to reform methane to produce syngas (where the syngas can be used as feedstock to produce hydrogen, ammonia and methanol); and to produce hydrogen and oxygen by decomposing water thermochemically.

The PBMR is modular in that only small to mid-sized units will be designed. Larger power stations will be built by combining many of these modules. As of 2008, 400MWt was emerging as an optimum module size, considerably larger than the original concept size.

The PBMR is fuelled and moderated by graphite fuel spheres each containing TRISO coated low enriched uranium oxide fuel particles. There are 15000 fuel particles per fuel sphere the size of a billiard ball. "Each fuel pebble contains 9 g of uranium, and this holds enough generation capacity to sustain a family of four, for a year. Five tons of coal and up to 23 000 m3 of water will be required to generate one pebble's energy".

The concept is based on the AVR reactor and THTR in Germany, but modified to drive a Brayton closed-cycle gas turbine. The core design is annular with a centre column as a neutron reflector.

PBMR (Pty) Ltd – History 
Since its establishment in 1994, Pebble Bed Modular Reactor (Pty) Ltd grew into one of the largest nuclear reactor design teams in the world. In addition to the core team of some 700 people at the PBMR head-office in Centurion near Pretoria, more than 600 people at universities, private companies and research institutes were involved with the project.

In 2006, the US Department of Energy awarded the PBMR consortium the primary contract for the first phase of its New Generation Nuclear Plant (NGNP) project.  The scope for the first phase of this contract, which has now been completed, was for the pre-conceptual engineering of a nuclear co-generation plant for the production of electricity and hydrogen. Requests for proposals for the second phase of the NGNP project will soon be issued, to which the PBMR consortium will be responding within the next few months of 2009.

In 2009 PBMR (Pty) announced that it was looking at employing the technology for process heat applications, and some pebble bed reactor contracts had been put on hold to prevent unnecessary spending

Wind down in 2010 
In February 2010 the South Africa government announced it had stopped funding the development of the pebble bed modular reactor, and PBMR (Pty) stated it was considering 75% cuts in staff. The decision was taken because no customer or investor for PBMR was found. Unresolved technical items, a substantial increase of costs and a 2008 report from Forschungszentrum Jülich about major problems in operation of the German pebble bed reactor AVR had discouraged potential investors. International banks refused to support the PBMR project by loans. PBMR's CEO resigned on March, 8th 2010.

In May 2010 Westinghouse withdrew from the PBMR consortium, which led to an end of the South African engagement in NGNP.

On 25 May 2010 the company announced to staff that it intends to implement a "Care and Maintenance" Strategy. This involves the reduction of staff to 9. The stated purpose of the proposed structure is; preserve PBMR as a legal entity, preserve and optimise IP, preserve HTR license, preserve assets and solicit new investors. The strategy assumes that keeping on 9 employees in the medium term will leave sufficient funding to take PBMR to March 2013. The remaining employees will serve to end of October 2010. Some funding is foreseen for dismantling of the PBMR fuel fabrication laboratories in 2011.

In Sept 2010 the SA govt announced that in future, the South African nuclear program will concentrate on conventional light water reactors.

The NGNP project will continue on HTGRs with prismatic fuel elements, not with pebbles as in PBMR, as was announced in February 2012.

R9.244 billion (US$1.3 billion) had been invested in the PBMR project. Over 80% came from the South African government, with smaller amounts from Eskom (8.8%), Westinghouse (4.9%), Industrial Development Corporation (4.9%) and Exelon (1.1%).

References

External links
 PBMR (Pty) Ltd
 Special report published by Pebble Bed Modular Reactor (Pty) Ltd of South Africa on the High Temperature Reactor Conference  (HTR) that was held from 28 September to 1 October 2008 in Washington D.C.
 Proceedings HTR 2004
 Abstract of PBMR design for the future, describing PBMR development 1994–2002.

Pebble bed reactors
Nuclear power reactor types
Nuclear technology in South Africa